Kyle Bruckmann (born 1971) is an American composer and oboist based in San Francisco, California.

Getting his musical start playing in industrial and hardcore bands, Bruckmann then studied oboe with Robert Atherholt at Rice University. He earned his masters at the University of Michigan (MM 1996) under Harry Sargous and contemporary improvisor Ed Sarath.

His musical aesthetic varies widely, from traditional Western classical to free jazz, electronic music and post-punk rock. and he cites Charlemagne Palestine as an influence.

His work has been recorded by the labels Porter Records, 482 Music, and New World Records, among others.

Currently, he is the Assistant Professor of Practice in Oboe and Contemporary Music at the University of Pacific Conservatory of Music.

References

All About Jazz "AAJ Artist Page".
Chicago Reader "Kyle Bruckmann's Wrack".
Another Timbre "Interview with Kyle Bruckmann & Ernst Karel (EKG)".

External links

Discography on Allmusic.com

1971 births
Living people
21st-century classical composers
American experimental musicians
American oboists
Male oboists
Musicians from the San Francisco Bay Area
University of Michigan School of Music, Theatre & Dance alumni
21st-century American musicians
Male classical composers
21st-century American male musicians
Locust Music artists